Ian Cooke may refer to:

 Ian Cooke (field hockey) (born 1952), Australian field hockey player
 Ian Cooke (footballer), English former footballer
 Ian Cooke (musician), Chicago area folk musician

See also
 Ian Cook (disambiguation)